In the Māori mythology of the Ngāti Hau tribe, Hine-kau-ataata (Woman floating in shadow), is the daughter of Tiki (Man) and Mārikoriko (Twilight). When she is born, the first clouds appear in the sky.

Māori gods